The Israel–Morocco normalization agreement is an agreement announced by the United States government on December 10, 2020, in which Israel and Morocco agreed to begin normalizing relations. On December 22, 2020, a joint declaration was signed pledging to quickly begin direct flights, promote economic cooperation, reopen liaison offices and move toward "full diplomatic, peaceful and friendly relations." Morocco officially recognized Israel in its communication to Israeli Prime Minister Benjamin Netanyahu.

The agreement followed Bahrain, the United Arab Emirates, and Sudan also signing normalization agreements with Israel in September and October 2020. Along with Egypt and Jordan, Morocco became the sixth Arab League country to normalize ties with Israel. As part of the agreement, the United States agreed to recognize Morocco's annexation of Western Sahara while urging the parties to "negotiate a mutually acceptable solution" using Morocco's autonomy plan as the only framework.

Background

Morocco had a large Jewish population of about 250,000 to 350,000 Jews (10% of the population) prior to Israel's establishment in 1948, and hundreds of thousands of Israeli Jews have lineage that traces to Morocco. In 2020 the Jewish population in Morocco numbered approximately 2,000.

During the 1973 Yom Kippur War, Moroccan soldiers, of which hundreds of them were killed, formed part of the Arab expeditionary forces supplying Egypt and Syria.

The two countries have long had informal ties, establishing low-level diplomatic relations during the 1990s following Israel's interim peace accords with the Palestinians, which were suspended after the start of the Al-Aqsa Intifada in 2000. The two countries have maintained informal ties since then, with an estimated 50,000 Israelis traveling to Morocco each year.

The agreement was negotiated by a team led by Jared Kushner, a Senior Advisor to the President of the United States, and Avi Berkowitz, a Special Representative for International Negotiations. Kushner and Berkowitz had been speaking with the Moroccan government for over two years, suggesting normalization of relations with Israel in exchange for US recognition of Morocco's claim to Western Sahara. When Kushner visited Morocco in May 2019, King Mohammed VI raised the issue of US recognition of Western Sahara, emphasizing the importance of this issue to Morocco.

A main push factor for the deal and Israel's other normalization agreements in 2020 is that it facilitates a united front against Iran to reduce its influence in the region. Morocco has viewed Iran as a threat, and cut ties with the Iranian government in 2018, accusing it of funding the Western Saharan separatist movement Polisario Front via Hezbollah.

The agreement followed Bahrain, the United Arab Emirates, and Sudan also signing normalization agreements with Israel in September and October 2020. Along with Egypt and Jordan, Morocco became the sixth Arab League country to normalise ties with Israel.

Agreement

Under the agreement, initially announced by the White House on 10 December 2020, Morocco will establish full diplomatic relations and trade relations and resume official contacts with Israel, and direct flights will be made between the two countries. Morocco officially recognized Israel in its communication to Israeli Prime Minister Benjamin Netanyahu. According to Kushner: "They are going to reopen their liaison offices in Rabat and Tel Aviv immediately with the intention to open embassies." Minister Delegate Mohcine Jazouli of the Moroccan Ministry of Foreign Affairs and International Cooperation said "Judaism is embedded in Moroccan culture," and that Jewish history would "appear in school textbooks and would soon be taught." Serge Berdugo, secretary-general of the Council of Jewish Communities of Morocco, said that the decision to teach Jewish history and culture in Moroccan schools "has the impact of a tsunami; [it] is a first in the Arab world."

On December 22, 2020, Senior Advisor to the U.S. President Jared Kushner and Israel's National Security Advisor Meir Ben-Shabbat, whose family immigrated to Israel from Morocco, were among the high-level officials who boarded a flight from Israel to Rabat, Morocco, to sign a joint declaration pledging to start direct flights between the two countries, promote economic cooperation, reopen liaison offices, and move toward full diplomatic relations. The US also agreed to recognize Morocco's claim to the disputed Western Sahara territory while urging the parties to negotiate "using Morocco's autonomy plan as the only framework to negotiate a mutually acceptable solution." "The US recognizes Moroccan sovereignty over the entire Western Sahara territory and reaffirms its support for Morocco's serious, credible and realistic autonomy proposal as the only basis for a just and lasting solution to the dispute over the Western Sahara territory,” Trump said. Kushner called on both sides to work with the U.N. in implementing a proposal to give the people of the territory broad autonomy. The US said it intends to open a consulate in Dakhla in Western Sahara.

Reactions

Israel and Morocco

In an address on the occasion of Hanukkah, Israeli Prime Minister Benjamin Netanyahu hailed the decision, and spoke of the "tremendous friendship shown by the kings of Morocco and the people of Morocco to the Jewish community there".

Following the announcement, the Moroccan royal cabinet issued a press release regarding a phone call between King Mohammed VI and Palestinian leader Mahmoud Abbas. The Moroccan government reaffirmed that its stance on the Palestine issue remained unchanged. The religious branch of the moderate Islamist Justice and Development Party in government denounced the agreement, while a group of activists planning to hold an anti-normalization protest were dispersed by Moroccan police, a move which was described by Abdessamad Fathi, president of the Al Adl Wa Al Ihssane-affiliated Moroccan Instance for the Support of Ummah Affairs, as evidencing that the deal was "imposed on Moroccans".

United States
US Senator Ted Cruz (R-Texas), a member of the Senate Foreign Relations Committee, stated: "Today is a wonderful day for Morocco and Israel... I've long advocated that if the United States is unequivocal and clear that we stand with our Israeli allies and against our mutual enemies, our regional allies will come together to the benefit of our own national security and the safety of the American people." Senator Tom Cotton (R-Arkansas) stated: "I commend our friend and partner, the Kingdom of Morocco, for establishing diplomatic relations with Israel. Morocco’s decision is another vital step towards peace in the Middle East and Africa." Former Senator Norm Coleman (R-Minnesota) called the agreement "historic" and an "important step towards greater stability and peace in the region."

US Senator Jim Inhofe (R-Oklahoma) sharply criticized the Trump administration for recognizing Morocco's claim to Western Sahara. Inhofe described the decision as "shocking and deeply disappointing," adding that he was "saddened that the rights of the Western Saharan people have been traded away." Former National Security Advisor John Bolton also criticized Trump for recognizing Morocco's claim, writing on Twitter that "Trump was wrong to abandon thirty years of US policy on Western Sahara just to score a fast foreign policy victory." In October 2021, a draft bill of the US Senate Committee on Appropriations for the allocation of 2022's budget said that "none of the funds […] may be used to support the construction or operation in the Western Sahara of a United States consulate." In December 2020, Mike Pompeo, Secretary of State under Trump's administration had announced the start of the process to establish one.

United Nations
U.N. Secretary-General António Guterres welcomed the agreement, but reserved judgment on the Western Sahara, according to a spokesman. The UN said that its position on Western Sahara was "unchanged" following the US announcement, with a spokesperson of Guterres suggesting that "the solution to the question can still be found based on Security Council resolutions." On December 21, 2020, following a closed door session of the security council, the South African ambassador said "We believe that any recognition of Western Sahara as part of Morocco is tantamount to recognizing illegality as such recognition is incompatible with international law."

Arab countries
Egyptian President Abdel Fattah el-Sisi welcomed the announcement, saying that the deal was an "important step towards more stability and regional cooperation" in the Middle East. Abu Dhabi's crown prince Sheikh Mohammed bin Zayed Al Nahyan wrote on Twitter: "This ... contributes to strengthening our common quest for stability, prosperity, and just and lasting peace in the region." Bahrain and Oman praised the agreement. Tunisian Prime Minister Hichem Mechichi said: "We respect Morocco's choice." Saudi Arabia's King Salman said "We support the efforts of the current US administration to achieve peace in the Middle East."

Algerian Prime Minister Abdelaziz Djerad expressed his country's dissatisfaction with Morocco's normalization of its relations with Israel, remarking there is "a desire to bring the Israeli and Zionist entity to our borders." For its part, the Movement of Society for Peace (HAMS), the largest Islamic party in Algeria, considered the normalization of Morocco's relations with Israel as a "sinister decision", and a "threat to the Maghreb countries to introduce them into the cycle of unrest that was far from them, and to bring to the enemy's intrigue on our borders". As for the U.S. recognition of Moroccan sovereignty over Western Sahara, Algeria said it "has no legal effect because it contradicts U.N. resolutions, especially U.N. Security Council resolutions on Western Sahara".

Others
Iran condemned Morocco's normalization of relations with Israel. A senior Iranian official said the normalization was a "betrayal and a stab in the back of Palestinians".

Spanish foreign affairs minister Arancha González Laya said that the country welcomed the normalization of relations, but rejected the US's recognition of Morocco's claim to Western Sahara. Russia welcomed the restoration of diplomatic ties between the countries but condemned Trump's decision to recognize Morocco's sovereignty over Western Sahara, saying it breaches international law.

See also

 Abraham Accords
 Camp David Accords
 Beit Yehuda Synagogue

References

External links
 Proclamation on Recognizing The Sovereignty Of The Kingdom Of Morocco Over The Western Sahara

December 2020 events in Africa
December 2020 events in Asia
December 2020 events in the United States
2020 in international relations
2020 in Israel
2020 in Morocco
2020 in the United States
Politics of Israel
Politics of Morocco
Treaties of Israel
Treaties of Morocco
Treaties concluded in 2020
Peace treaties of Israel
Arab–Israeli peace process
Arab–Israeli alliance against Iran
Abraham Accords
Israel–Morocco relations
Israel–United States relations
Morocco–United States relations
Presidency of Donald Trump
Benjamin Netanyahu
Mohammed VI of Morocco